Lars Rosing (born 25 January 1972) is a Danish-Greenlandic actor. Brother of film director Otto Rosing. Born in Maniitsoq, a town in western Greenland, he grew up in Ilulissat, a larger town further north. Rosing later resided in Nuuk, the capital of Greenland.

Career 
Lars Rosing plays the protagonist Malik in Greenland's first international feature film Nuummioq. Lars Rosing lives near Montreal in Canada.

References

External links
 Lars Rosing Official Website

1972 births
Greenlandic male actors
Greenlandic Inuit people
Greenlandic people of Danish descent
Living people
People from Maniitsoq
People from Nuuk
People from Ilulissat
Greenlandic emigrants to Canada
Male actors from Montreal